The Filangieri (Old Norman Fitz Anger, Latin Filii Angerii meaning "sons of Angerio") were an Italo-Norman noble family with origins (c.1100) near Nocera in the Kingdom of Sicily, but they rose to prominence at Naples. Famous members include: 
Giordano Filangieri I
Riccardo Filangieri I, son of Giordano I
Giordano Filangieri II, son of Giordano I
Lotterio Filangieri I
Enrico Filangieri
Marino Filangieri
Lotterio Filangieri II, son of Giordano II
Aldoino Filangieri di Candida, son of Giordano II
Riccardo Filangieri di Candida
Guido Filangieri
Giordano Filangieri III
Gaetano Filangieri
Carlo Filangieri, son of Gaetano
 Gaetano Filangieri, prince of Satriano, son of Carlo, founder of the Museo Civico Filangieri

External links
 Genealogia dei Filangieri (XIe s.–XVIe s.) 
 Genealogia dei Filangieri (1256–1409) 
 Nobiliario di Sicilia

Italo-Norman families